Golpes Bajos was a 1980s pop group in Spain, a part of the so-called "Edad de Oro del Pop Español", i.e. "The Golden Age of Spanish Pop Music". They were active in 1982–1986, with a final reunion tour in 1997–1998.

History
Golpes Bajos was a pop group created in 1982 in Vigo (Pontevedra), Spain. It was initially a duo formed by Germán Coppini (the-then lead singer of Siniestro Total) and Teo Cardalda (composing music and playing various instruments). The group subsequently expanded after spring 1983 with Pablo Novoa and Luis García, who both shared with Teo the work covering multiple keyboards, bass, guitars and drums.

When the group became famous and started making hits, Germán Coppini quit his part-time work with Siniestro Total to devote himself completely to Golpes Bajos.

Five songs included in their debut album were: "No mires a los ojos de la gente" ("Do not look in the eyes of the people"), "Malos tiempos para la lírica" ("Bad times for the Song"), "Lágrimas" ("Tears"), "Estoy enfermo" ("I'm Sick") and "Tendré que salir algún día" ("I'll have to leave one day").

In 1984, Golpes Bajos released their first full album with the title "A santa compaña" ("The Sacred Company"). Songs included "Hansel and Gretel", "Colecciono Moscas" ("I collect Flies") and "Cena recalentada" ("Dinner reheated").

After releasing the mini-LP "Devocionario", the founding duo decided to dissolve the group, and moved to other music projects. In 1987, Coppini began his solo career. He made a brief collaboration with Nacho Cano ("Dame un chupito de amor" or "Give me a shot of love", Ariola, 1986). Coppini then opted for riskier musical terrain: "El ladrón de Bagdag" ("The Thief of Baghdad", 1987), "Flechas Negras" ("Black Arrows", 1989) and "Carabas" (1996).

After a brief interlude with the experimental "Desfigurat" (1987) for a choreography by César Gilabert, Teo Cardalda launched a new career as a producer. Then, he formed a new band, Duendes (later Cómplices), along with his partner, María Monsonís, launching a career that gave him many commercial successes over the next decade.

In November 1997, Coppini and Cardalda reunited to record a television documentary directed by the Basque filmmaker Juanma Bajo Ulloa.
They re-released songs from their golden age in a live album "Vivo" ("Alive"), which they presented in a tour that began in March 1998. Neither García nor Novoa were invited. When the tour, which was a resounding failure, ended, Cardalda decided to return to Cómplices, finally ending the history of Golpes Bajos.

Records

Albums
 A Santa Compaña (Nuevos Medios, 1984)
 Vivo (Nuevos Medios, 1998)

EPs
 Golpes Bajos (Nuevos Medios, 1983)
 Devocionario (Nuevos Medios, 1985)

Singles
 Colecciono Moscas – 1984  Fiesta de los Maniquíes – 1984
 La Virgen Loca – 1985
 Desconocido – 1985
 Cena Recalentada – 1990
 Malos Tiempos para la Lírica – 1998

Compilations
 Todas Sus Grabaciones 1983/1985 (Nuevos Medios, 1991)

Notes

References
 Data sheet for Golpes Bajos on POPes80 (in Spanish): POPes80-Golpesbajos.
 Official website for de Germán Coppini:  geocities.com-biografia.
 Webpage for Pablo Novoa on MySpace.com: MySpace.com-pablonovoa.
 Data sheet for Golpes Bajos on MTV.es: MTV.es-golpes .

Musical groups established in 1982
Spanish pop music groups
People from Vigo
1982 establishments in Spain